Per Axel Hjalmar Cederblom (22 May 1901 – 23 January 1987) was a Swedish breaststroke swimmer who competed in the 1920 Summer Olympics. He was born and died in Gothenburg.

In 1920 he finished fifth in the 400 metre breaststroke competition. He also participate in the final of the 200 metre breaststroke event but he did not finish the race.

References

External links
profile

1901 births
1987 deaths
Olympic swimmers of Sweden
Swimmers at the 1920 Summer Olympics
Swedish male breaststroke swimmers
Swimmers from Gothenburg